Don Edwards ( – October 23, 2022) was an American cowboy singer and guitarist who performed Western music. He recorded several albums, two of which, Guitars & Saddle Songs and Songs of the Cowboy, are included in the Folklore Archives of the Library of Congress. Edwards also recorded the album High Lonesome Cowboy with Peter Rowan and Tony Rice.

Biography
He left home at the age of 16 to work on Texas oil fields and experience the western life. He made his professional debut in 1961 after he was hired as a singer, actor, and stuntman at the newly opened Six Flags Over Texas. He worked there for five years before moving to Nashville to seek a recording contract. In 1993 he appeared on Nanci Griffith's Grammy Award winning album Other Voices, Other Rooms on which he accompanied Griffith on a Michael Burton song entitled "Night Rider's Lament".

In 2005, Don Edwards was inducted into the Western Music Association Hall of Fame.

Edwards died on October 23, 2022, at the age of 86.

In popular culture
Edwards played the character Smokey in Robert Redford's The Horse Whisperer. Edwards also performed the song "Coyotes" that plays during the final minutes of the documentary Grizzly Man.

Discography 
 1980 Happy Cowboy
 1990 Desert Nights and Cowtown Blues
 1992 Songs of the Trail
 1993 Goin' Back To Texas
 1994 The Bard and the Balladeer: Live from Cowtown (with Waddie Mitchell)
 1996 West Of Yesterday 
 1997 Saddle Songs (a collection of the albums Guitars & Saddle Songs and Songs of the Cowboy)
 1998 Best Of Don Edwards
 1998 My Hero, Gene Autry: A Tribute  
 2000 Prairie Portrait
 2001 On the Trail (with Waddie Mitchell)
 2001 Kin To The Wind: Memories Of Martin Robbins
 2004 Last Of The Troubadours: Saddle Songs Vol. 2
 2004 High Lonesome Cowboy (with Peter Rowan)
 2006 Moonlight & Skies
 2009 Heaven on Horseback
 2010 American

Notes

References

Further reading

External links
 Official music website
 Artist profile at cowboypoetry.com
 Don Edwards: In His Own Words (30-minute interview)
 Don Edwards Interview NAMM Oral History Library (2016)
 

1930s births
Year of birth missing (living people)
2022 deaths
People from Boonton, New Jersey
Country musicians from New Jersey
American male singers
American country singer-songwriters
Singing cowboys
People from Texas
Shanachie Records artists
Warner Records artists